Chevy Chase Theater or Theatre may refer to: 

 Avalon Theatre (Washington, D.C.), originally known as the Chevy Chase Theatre
 Earl Carroll Theatre (Los Angeles), briefly known as the Chevy Chase Theater in 1993